|-
| Babića Brdo 
| Glamoč
| Canton 10
|-
| Babin Do 
| Neum
| Herzegovina-Neretva Canton
|-
| Babin Potok 
| Donji Vakuf
| Central Bosnia Canton
|-
| Babino Selo 
| Donji Vakuf
| Central Bosnia Canton
|-
| Bačci
| Goražde
| Bosnian-Podrinje Canton Goražde
|-
| Bačevići
| Mostar
| Herzegovina-Neretva Canton
|-
| Bačvice 
| Travnik
| Central Bosnia Canton
|-
| Baćina
| Jablanica
|
|-
| Badnje 
| Kiseljak
| Central Bosnia Canton
|-
| Bahovo
| Goražde
| Bosnian-Podrinje Canton Goražde
|-
| Bajovci
| Čapljina
| Herzegovina-Neretva Canton
|-
| Bakije
| Goražde
| Bosnian-Podrinje Canton Goražde
|-
| Bakovići 
| Fojnica
| Central Bosnia Canton
|-
| Bakovićka Citonja 
| Fojnica
| Central Bosnia Canton
|-
| Bale
| Konjic
| Herzegovina-Neretva Canton
|-
| Balići 
| Novi Travnik
| Central Bosnia Canton
|-
| Baljci 
| Tomislavgrad
| Canton 10
|-
| Baljivac
| Ravno
| Herzegovina-Neretva Canton
|-
| Bandol 
| Travnik
| Central Bosnia Canton
|-
| Banja 
| Fojnica
| Central Bosnia Canton
|-
| Banjdol 
| Mostar
| Herzegovina-Neretva Canton
|-
| Baonine 
| Ravno
| Herzegovina-Neretva Canton
|-
| Barane
| 
|
|-
| Barbarići 
| Bugojno
| Central Bosnia Canton
|-
| Bare 
| Busovača
| Central Bosnia Canton
|-
| Bare
| Goražde
| Bosnian-Podrinje Canton Goražde
|-
| Bare 
| Jajce
| Central Bosnia Canton
|-
| Bare
| Konjic
| Herzegovina-Neretva Canton
|-
| Bare
| Posušje
| West Herzegovina Canton
|-
| Barevo (part)
| Jajce
| Central Bosnia Canton
|-
| Barice
| Donji Vakuf
| Central Bosnia Canton
|-
| Barjamovci
| Kupres
| Canton 10
|-
| Barmiš
| Konjic
| Herzegovina-Neretva Canton
|-
| Bastasi
| Drvar
| Canton 10
|-
| Bastasi 
| Bosansko Grahovo
| Canton 10
|-
| Bašabulići
| Novo Goražde
|
|-
| Bašići 
| Bugojno
| Central Bosnia Canton
|-
| Batin
| 
| West Herzegovina Canton
|-
| Batkovići
| Goražde
| Bosnian-Podrinje Canton Goražde
|-
| Batuša 
| Uskoplje
| Central Bosnia Canton
|-
| Bavar 
| Jajce
| Central Bosnia Canton
|-
| Bavčići
| Foča
|
|-
| Begovo Selo 
| Kupres
| Canton 10
|-
| Behrići 
| Kiseljak
| Central Bosnia Canton
|-
| Belenići 
| Ravno
| Herzegovina-Neretva Canton
|-
| Bešlići
| Foča
|
|-
| Bevrnjići 
| Bugojno
| Central Bosnia Canton
|-
| Bezmilje
| Goražde
| Bosnian-Podrinje Canton Goražde
|-
| Bihać
| Bihać
| Una-Sana Canton
|-
| Bijača
| Ljubuški
| West Herzegovina Canton
|-
| Bijakovići
| Čitluk
| Herzegovina-Neretva Canton
|-
| Bijela
| Jablanica
| Herzegovina-Neretva Canton
|-
| Bijela
| Konjic
| Herzegovina-Neretva Canton
|-
| Bijelo Bučje 
| Travnik
| Central Bosnia Canton
|-
| Bila 
| Livno
| Canton 10
|-
| Bila 
| Vitez
| Central Bosnia Canton
|-
| Bilalovac 
| Kiseljak
| Central Bosnia Canton
|-
| Biletići
| Čitluk
| Herzegovina-Neretva Canton
|-
| Biličić 
| Glamoč
| Canton 10
|-
| Bilići 
| Travnik
| Central Bosnia Canton
|-
| Bilo Polje 
| Livno
| Canton 10
|-
| Bili Potok 
| Kupres
| Canton 10
|-
| Biljin
| Goražde
| Bosnian-Podrinje Canton Goražde
|-
| Biograci 
| Široki Brijeg
| West Herzegovina Canton
|-
| Biokovine 
| Jajce
| Central Bosnia Canton
|-
| Bistrica 
| Jajce
| Central Bosnia Canton
|-
| Bistrica 
| Fojnica
| Central Bosnia Canton
|-
| Bistrica 
| Uskoplje
| Central Bosnia Canton
|-
| Bistro 
| Novi Travnik
| Central Bosnia Canton
|-
| Bivolje Brdo
| Čapljina
| Herzegovina-Neretva Canton
|-
| Bjelojevići
| 
|
|-
| Bjelovići 
| Kreševo
| Central Bosnia Canton
|-
| Bjelovčina
| Konjic
| Herzegovina-Neretva Canton
|-
| Blace
| Konjic
| Herzegovina-Neretva Canton
|-
| Blace 
| Prozor-Rama
| Herzegovina-Neretva Canton
|-
| Blagaj 
| Donji Vakuf
| Central Bosnia Canton
|-
| Blagaj 
| Kupres
| Canton 10
|-
| Blagaj 
| Mostar
| Herzegovina-Neretva Canton
|-
| Blagojevići
| Novo Goražde
|
|-
| Blaževići
| Grude
| West Herzegovina Canton
|-
| Blažuj 
| Tomislavgrad
| Canton 10
|-
| Blizanci
| Čitluk
| Herzegovina-Neretva Canton
|-
| Bliznice 
| Kiseljak
| Central Bosnia Canton
|-
| Blučići
| Konjic
| Herzegovina-Neretva Canton
|-
| Boboljusci 
| Drvar
| Canton 10
|-
| Bobovišta 
| Ravno
| Herzegovina-Neretva Canton
|-
| Bode 
| Bugojno
| Central Bosnia Canton
|-
| Bogdanići
| Novo Goražde
|
|-
| Bogdaše 
| Livno
| Canton 10
|-
| Bogdašić 
| Tomislavgrad
| Canton 10
|-
| Bogušići
| Goražde
| Herzegovina-Neretva Canton
|-
| Bogodol 
| Mostar
| Herzegovina-Neretva Canton
|-
| Bojmunte 
| Livno
| Canton 10
|-
| Bojska 
| Uskoplje
| Central Bosnia Canton
|-
| Boljkovac 
| Uskoplje
| Central Bosnia Canton
|-
| Boljkovići 
| Kiseljak
| Central Bosnia Canton
|-
| Borajna
| Grude
| West Herzegovina Canton
|-
| Borak Brdo
| Novo Goražde
|
|-
| Borci
| Konjic
| Herzegovina-Neretva Canton
|-
| Borina 
| Kiseljak
| Central Bosnia Canton
|-
| Borčani 
| Tomislavgrad
| Canton 10
|-
| Borojevići
| 
|
|-
| Borova Ravan 
| Uskoplje
| Central Bosnia Canton
|-
| Borovići
| Goražde
| Bosnian-Podrinje Canton Goražde
|-
| Borovnica 
| Prozor-Rama
| Herzegovina-Neretva Canton
|-
| Borut 
| Neum
| Herzegovina-Neretva Canton
|-
| Bosanska Krupa
| Bosanska Krupa
| Una-Sana Canton
|-
| Bosanski Osredci 
| Drvar
| Canton 10
|-
| Bosanski Petrovac
| Bosanski Petrovac
| Una-Sana Canton
|-
| Bosansko Grahovo 
| Bosansko Grahovo
| Canton 10
|-
| Bosanje
| Novo Goražde
|
|-
| Boškovići
| Goražde
| Bosnian-Podrinje Canton Goražde
|-
| Botun 
| Fojnica
| Central Bosnia Canton
|-
| Botun 
| Kupres
| Canton 10
|-
| Botunja 
| Kreševo
| Central Bosnia Canton
|-
| Boždarevići
| Konjic
| Herzegovina-Neretva Canton
|-
| Božići 
| Fojnica
| Central Bosnia Canton
|-
| Božići 
| Novi Travnik
| Central Bosnia Canton
|-
| Božikovac 
| Jajce
| Central Bosnia Canton
|-
| Bradina
| Konjic
| Herzegovina-Neretva Canton
|-
| Brajkovići 
| Travnik
| Central Bosnia Canton
|-
| Brajići 
| Travnik
| Central Bosnia Canton
|-
| Brajlovići
| Goražde
| Bosnian-Podrinje Canton Goražde
|-
| Brankovac 
| Travnik
| Central Bosnia Canton
|-
| Bratiš
| Goražde
| Bosnian-Podrinje Canton Goražde
|-
| Bravnice 
| Jajce
| Central Bosnia Canton
|-
| Brda 
| Bugojno
| Central Bosnia Canton
|-
| Brda 
| Donji Vakuf
| Central Bosnia Canton
|-
| Brda 
| Drvar
| Canton 10
|-
| Brda 
| Kupres
| Canton 10
|-
| Brdo 
| Donji Vakuf
| Central Bosnia Canton
|-
| Brdo 
| Vitez
| Central Bosnia Canton
|-
| Brđani
| Konjic
| Herzegovina-Neretva Canton
|-
| Brekovi
| Goražde
| Bosnian-Podrinje Canton Goražde
|-
| Brestica 
| Neum
| Herzegovina-Neretva Canton
|-
| Brezičani 
| Donji Vakuf
| Central Bosnia Canton
|-
| Brezje
| Goražde
| Bosnian-Podrinje Canton Goražde
|-
| Brijeg
| Goražde
| Bosnian-Podrinje Canton Goražde
|-
| Bristovi 
| Bugojno
| Central Bosnia Canton
|-
| Brizje 
| Kiseljak
| Central Bosnia Canton
|-
| Brižina 
| Bugojno
| Central Bosnia Canton
|-
| Brnjaci 
| Kiseljak
| Central Bosnia Canton
|-
| Brnjići 
| Dobretići
| Central Bosnia Canton
|-
| Broćanac 
| Neum
| Herzegovina-Neretva Canton
|-
| Broćanac
| Posušje
| West Herzegovina Canton
|-
| Brštanica 
| Neum
| Herzegovina-Neretva Canton
|-
| Brvanci 
| Jajce
| Central Bosnia Canton
|-
| Bučići
| Jajce
| Central Bosnia Canton
|-
| Bučići 
| Novi Travnik
| Central Bosnia Canton
|-
| Bučje
| Goražde
| Bosnian-Podrinje Canton Goražde
|-
| Bućevača 
| Kupres
| Canton 10
|-
| Budići
| Goražde
| Bosnian-Podrinje Canton Goražde
|-
| Budišnja Ravan
| Konjic
| Herzegovina-Neretva Canton
|-
| Budušići 
| Novi Travnik
| Central Bosnia Canton
|-
| Bugojčići 
| Novi Travnik
| Central Bosnia Canton
|-
| Bugojno
| Bugojno
| Central Bosnia Canton
|-
| Buhovo 
| Široki Brijeg
| West Herzegovina Canton
|-
| Bukova Gora 
| Tomislavgrad
| Canton 10
|-
| Bukovci 
| Busovača
| Central Bosnia Canton
|-
| Bukovica 
| Kiseljak
| Central Bosnia Canton
|-
| Bukovica
| Konjic
| Herzegovina-Neretva Canton
|-
| Bukovica 
| Tomislavgrad
| Canton 10
|-
| Bukovlje
| Konjic
| Herzegovina-Neretva Canton
|-
| Bukva 
| Kreševo
| Central Bosnia Canton
|-
| Bukve 
| Vitez
| Central Bosnia Canton
|-
| Bukvići 
| Novi Travnik
| Central Bosnia Canton
|-
| Bulatovići
| Konjic
| Herzegovina-Neretva Canton
|-
| Bulići 
| Jajce
| Central Bosnia Canton
|-
| Buna 
| Mostar
| Herzegovina-Neretva Canton
|-
| Bunar 
| Dobretići
| Central Bosnia Canton
|-
| Bunčevac 
| Drvar
| Canton 10
|-
| Bunčići
| Foča
|
|-
| Burmazi (part)
| 
|
|-
| Buselji 
| Busovača
| Central Bosnia Canton
|-
| Busovača
| Busovača
| Central Bosnia Canton
|-
| Bušćak
| Konjic
| Herzegovina-Neretva Canton
|-
| Butkovići
| Goražde
| Bosnian-Podrinje Canton Goražde
|-
| Butkovići Ilovača
| Goražde
| Bosnian-Podrinje Canton Goražde
|-
| Buturović Polje
| Konjic
| Herzegovina-Neretva Canton
|-
| Buzuci 
| Kiseljak
| Central Bosnia Canton
|}

Lists of settlements in the Federation of Bosnia and Herzegovina (A-Ž)